Gray Weicker is an American retired ice hockey goaltender who was an All-American for St. Lawrence.

Career
Weicker began his college career in the fall of 1979 as a member of Leon Abbott's final recruiting class. The team began the season well but lost 8 consecutive games before Christmas, leading to Abbott's resignation part way through the season. After finishing out the dismal season last in their conference, changes were sure to come. Weicker had played just 3 games that season and, once new coach Mike McShane was brought in, he began to see his time in goal increase. By the time his junior season rolled around, Weicker was the team's primary starter as well as being an alternate captain. SLU posted its first winning season in nearly a decade and Weicker finished in the top 10 in the nation with a 3.17 goals against average.

For his senior season Weicker was named team captain and led the Saints to their best season in over 20 years. St. Lawrence won the west division in ECAC Hockey and set a new program record with 23 wins, only the second 20+ win season in team history. Weicker was named an All-American and set a program record with 21 wins. St. Lawrence finished 4th in the ECAC tournament that season but, because of the team's regular season success, the Saints made their first NCAA Tournament appearance since 1962. St. Lawrence was felled by eventual champion Wisconsin but Weicker's time in Canton was still a rousing success for the program.

After graduating with a degree in sociology, Weicker signed with the Hartford Whalers and played the following season in their farm system. Success as a professional was had to come by, however, and Weicker retired after just one season to work on the floor of the New York Stock Exchange. In 2001, while serving as a managing director for his own firm (Polcari/Weicker), he began coaching his daughters when they started playing hockey. He maintained his interest in coaching and continued to teach girls' hockey, working with the Darien High School girls' hockey team as of 2021.

Statistics

Regular season and playoffs

Awards and honors

References

External links

1960 births
Living people
AHCA Division I men's ice hockey All-Americans
Ice hockey players from Connecticut
Sportspeople from Greenwich, Connecticut
American ice hockey goaltenders
St. Lawrence Saints men's ice hockey players
Binghamton Whalers players
Mohawk Valley Stars players